Basketball competitions at the 2019 European Games were held from 21 to 24 June 2019 at the Palova Arena in Minsk. The competition took place in the half-court 3x3 format, and both the men's and women's tournaments featured sixteen teams. Each qualifying team consisted of four players, of whom three could appear on court at any one time.

The 2019 FIBA 3x3 World Cup was held on overlapping days in Amsterdam, the Netherlands.

Qualification
A NOC may enter one men's team with four players and one women's team with four players. The host country qualifies automatically in each tournament, as do the top fifteen other teams at the FIBA 3x3 Federation World Ranking.

Qualified teams

Medal summary

References

External links
Official website
Medallists by event

 
2019
Sports at the 2019 European Games
International basketball competitions hosted by Belarus
European Games